Pseudocatharylla faduguella is a moth in the family Crambidae. It was described by Rob T.A. Schouten in 1994. It is found in Sierra Leone.

References

Crambinae
Moths described in 1994